Off The Lock is the 2nd studio album by the Japanese rock duo B'z.

The band's first-ever "Live Gym" tour was in support of this album, and despite them being relatively new, tickets were sold out, a taste of what was to come.

It was the second album they released for BMG Victor's Air Records imprint.

"Off the Lock" sold 4,590 copies in its first week and 604,700 copies throughout its chart run.

Track listing

Certifications

References

1989 albums
B'z albums
Japanese-language albums